Just the Tip is the second album from Irish-American comedian Robert Kelly. It was released on April 8, 2008.

Description
The name comes from a joke on the album, about Kelly's preferred sexual intercourse with a woman. The cover art makes use of this by showing just the top half of his head. The album was recorded on 26 July 2007 at the Comedy Connection in Boston.

The album is packaged with a DVD that contains a "Making of" featurette about the making of the album. It also contains a Comedy Central Presents segment on Kelly.

In April 2008, the album reached the 7th position of Billboard'''s top chart for comedy albums.

Track listing

DVD tracksComedy Central Presents Robert KellyMaking of Just the Tip''

References

2008 live albums
2008 video albums
Live video albums
Comedy Central Records live albums
Stand-up comedy albums
Spoken word albums by American artists
Comedy Central Records video albums
Robert Kelly (comedian) albums
2000s comedy albums